The ceintures de Lyon ('Belts of Lyon') were a series of fortifications built between 1830 and 1890 around the city of Lyon, France, to protect the city from foreign invasion.

The belts comprised two defensive barriers that included forts, lunettes, ramparts, batteries, and other defensive structures. Many of these structures proved to be ineffective in war due to advancement in weapon technology and the evolution of attack strategies at the time. Some of the fortifications of the ceintures de Lyon have been destroyed, though many remain today.

History 

After the July Revolution in 1830 and the end of the Bourbon monarchy, the government feared a new war. Austria was seen as the major threat to France at the time, and so protecting the east and south-east borders became a priority.

Construction of the first belt 

In 1830 the maréchal de camp, Hubert Rohault de Fleury, commenced a project designed by military engineer Baron Haxo. With a budget of  francs (approximately € as of 2015) allocated for Lyon between 1831 and 1839, this first project included the restoration of the fortifications between Croix Rousse and Fourvière; the construction of two forts on the plateau of Caluire (Fort de Montessuy and Fort de Caluire, connected by the Enceinte de Caluire), facing the Dombes; closing access to the Presqu'île by the construction of a south-facing building; building two forts – Fort de la Duchère and Fort de Grange Blanche – to protect access routes towards Paris and Auvergne.

The fortification of the city is divided into three sectors: The north was protected by the wall of Croix-Rousse and the structures between the Rhône and the Saône. The command was situated at fort de Montessuy. The west was covered by the hillfort of Fourvière and the associated forts of Vaise at Sainte-Foy. The command was situated at fort Saint-Irénée. The east was defended by the Redoute du Haut-Rhône and Fort de la Vitriolerie on the left bank of the Rhône. The command was situated at Fort Lamothe.

The work required almost  workers, which were locally sourced in an attempt to avoid insurrection such as the ongoing unrest of the Lyon silk workers (Canuts) over increased capitalism. Work began in 1831 to build seven structures, each structure requiring between 400 and 500 workers. The scope of this project included the construction of Fort de Montessuy and Fort de Caluire to the north; Fort des Brotteaux, Fort Montluc and Fort du Colombier to the east; the Redoute de la Part-Dieu to the west; and Fort Saint-Irénée, to protect the entire area.

In January 1831, an uprising began at a work site in Charpennes, however it was quickly stopped by the army. Other insurrections took place the same year, a series of Canut revolts, which succeeded in rallying soldiers on the side of the Canuts, resulting in the death of captain Viquesnel, aide-de-camp of Fleury, and the temporary withdrawal of the  soldiers who  eventually retook the city in December 1831.

In 1832, three other structures were built to reinforce the defenses to the east: The Redoute de la Tête d'or, Fort La Motte, and the Redoute des Hirondelles. A treaty was signed between the city of Lyon and the War Department, which stipulated that the city had to cede the land necessary for the construction of military buildings to the War Department, while the forts themselves would still belong to the city if the military decided to abandon them. It is thanks to this treaty that the forts of Croix Rousse, Fourvière, Loyasse, Vaise, and Saint-Jean would later be returned to the city.

Construction resumed in 1840. First the Fort de la Vitriolerie in 1840, then Fort de Sainte-Foy-lès-Lyon and the Lunette des Charpennes in 1842, Fort de la Duchère in 1844, the Redoute du Petit Sainte-Foy-lès-Lyon in 1852, and finally the Redoute du haut-Rhône in 1854.

A law was voted in on 10 July 1851, which defined the methods of destruction of these buildings or construction on their land. By 1854, 19 structures including 10 forts had been built around Lyon, creating a nearly  fortified perimeter.

Franco-Prussian War 

On 19 July 1870, France declared war on Prussia. On 20 August 1870, the Prussians besieged Metz, and Paris on 19 September 1870. It was feared that Lyon would be next. The army in Lyon was commanded by the général de division, Ulrich Ochsenbein at the time.

During the Battle of Sedan on 2 September 1870, France learned that the Germans did not focus on enemy defenses to force cities to surrender. Rather they destroyed homes and population centers using long-range incendiary artillery shells. The forts that were already constructed in France were therefore ineffective in defending against these attacks. The war ended after the signing of the Treaty of Frankfurt on 10 May 1871, and the Ministry of the Armed Forces requested a report on the construction of military works for the defense of Lyon on 4 August 1871.

A budget of  francs (approximately € as of 2015) was allocated for the defense of the Alps, half of that was used for the defense of Lyon to protect from invasion by the Swiss. The project was awarded by then president Patrice de MacMahon, to the director of Military engineering and Brigadier general Raymond Adolphe Séré de Rivières in 1874. The proposed defenses included the construction of a fort and batteries on Mont Verdun to protect the right bank of the Saône, the forts of Vénissieux, Bron and Cusset to protect the left banks of the Rhône, and a fortification between the Rhône and the Saône at la Pape.

Powder magazines 

Although most of the fortified structures had gunpowder magazines to supply the artillery, fortified magazines were set up behind the defense lines. Place de Lyon was divided into four sectors, each with its own dedicated gunpowder magazine. The first, (Fort du Mont Verdun) was created in Fort de la Duchère, the second (Fort de Vancia) at Sathonay, the third (Fort de Feyzin) in an underground magazine at Saint-Fons, and the fourth (fort du Bruissin) in Fort de Sainte-Foy. These magazines were connected by road or rail. An annex was built near Saint-Fons in 1895 to store picric acid.

Construction of the second belt 

Military leaders saw an urgent need to construct four additional forts: The Fort du Mont Verdun in 1874 to the north, the Fort de Bron and Fort de Feyzin in 1875 to the east, and the Fort de Vancia in 1876.

Other projects started in 1878 include the Batterie de la Freta, connected to fort du Mont Verdun; the Batterie de Sathonay and Batterie de Sermenaz, connected to Fort de Vancia; the Fort du Bruissin; the Fort de Corbas; and the Batteries de Parilly and Lessignas.

The construction of Fort du Paillet began in 1883, then Fort de Meyzieu and Fort de Genas the following year. Picric acid began to be used on the battlefield at this time. The explosion caused by this chemical was so powerful that the forts proved to be ineffective, and consequently their construction was temporarily put on hold. The damage caused by this new weapon, along with the rifled-barreled weapons deployed in battle in 1860, proved to be a significant problem.

An experiment was conducted in 1886 by military engineers to verify the power of picric acid and its impact on their fortification systems. Fort Malmaison, which had recently been constructed near Paris, was the target of 171 test shells of all calibers containing picric acid. The results showed that the impacts of the new shells left craters 6 meters in diameter, and were capable of breaching the powder magazine to create a huge explosion. An expensive and more effective fortification material, reinforced concrete, was available; however, it was only used on the forts of the Maginot Line and certain strategic parts of the Lyon forts, such as the barracks of Cavalier de Vancia.

The decree of 21 January 1887 by General Boulanger, then Minister of the Armies of the French Republic, renamed the military buildings to honor local military victors and victories. Therefore, Fort de Vaise became "Fort Clerc", Fort de Loyasse became "Fort Blandan" after Jean Pierre Hippolyte Blandan, Fort Saint-Jean was renamed "Fort Maupetit", Fort Saint-Irénée became "Fort Dubois-Crancé" after Edmond Louis Alexis Dubois-Crancé, Fort de la Vitriolerie became "Fort Chabert", fort de Villeurbanne became "Fort Montluc" after Blaise de Monluc, and the Barracks of Fort Part-Dieu became the "Barracks of Margaron" after Pierre Margaron.

On 22 July 1887, it also specified several modifications to be made to the forts, including moving the artillery from the forts to the batteries, and using concrete in place of traditional masonry. Fort de Saint-Priest was built with this new material in 1887, followed by Fort de Chapoly in 1891.

First belt 

The first belt, called the Rohault de Fleury system, consisted of 22 fortifications commissioned by Rohault de Fleury. They were situated in a radius of about  around the urban center of Lyon. This belt was constructed between 1830 and 1870.

 Fort de la Duchère (destroyed, currently a sports complex)
 Fort de Caluire (destroyed, currently a stadium Henri Cochet)
 Fort de Montessuy
 Redoute Bel-Air
 Fort de Sainte-Foy
 Lunette du Petit Sainte-Foy
 Fort Saint-Irénée
 Lunette du Fossoyeur
 Fort de Loyasse
 Fort de Vaise
 Fort Saint-Jean
 Bastion Saint-Laurent
 Redoute du haut-Rhône (destroyed, currently a park entrance)
 Redoute de la Tête d'Or (destroyed, currently Boulevard des Belges, Guimet Museum and parc de la Tête d'Or)
 Lunette des Charpennes (destroyed, currently lycée du Parc)
 Fort des Brotteaux (destroyed, currently Gare des Brotteaux)
 Redoute de la Part-Dieu (became the barracks of Part-Dieu, then later destroyed, currently Centre commercial de la Part Dieu)
 Fort Montluc
 Redoute des Hirondelles (destroyed, currently the :fr:Manufacture des Tabacs de Lyon)
 Fort Lamothe
 Fort du Colombier (destroyed, was on the site of place Jean-Macé)
 Fort de la Vitriolerie
 Rempart de la Croix-Rousse (destroyed in 1865, currently Boulevard de la Croix-Rousse)
 Enceinte de Fourvière
 Enceinte de Caluire (destroyed, currently the streets of Albert-Thomas and Place Professeur-Calmette)

Fort de Grange-Blanche and the Batterie de Pierre Scize were planned but never constructed.

Second belt 

The second belt, called the Séré de Rivières system, consisted of twenty-six fortifications surrounding the suburban area of Lyon. They were situated in an  ring around Lyon. The belt was constructed between 1871 and 1890.

 Mur d'enceinte de Croix-Luizet in Gerland (1884). Currently the location of the Boulevard périphérique de Lyon
 Fort du Mont Verdun (Air force, Mont-Verdun)
 Batterie des Carrières
 Batterie du Mont-Thou
 Batterie de Narcel
 Batterie de la Freta
 Fort de Vancia
 Batterie de Sathonay
 Magasin de Sathonay
 Batterie de Sermenaz
 Redoutes de Neyron ( and )
 Fort de Meyzieu
 Fort de Genas
 Fort de Bron
 Batterie de Lessivas
 Batterie de Parilly
 Fort de Saint-Priest
 Fort de Corbas
 Fort de Feyzin
 Fort de Champvillard
 Fort de Montcorin
 Fort de Côte-Lorette
 Fort du Bruissin
 Fort de Chapoly
 Fort du Paillet
 Magasin de Saint-Fons
 Batterie de Décines

The fortifications of d'Azieu, Vaulx-en-Velin, Millery, and Chêne-Rond in Dardilly were planned but never constructed.

See also 
 List of fortifications

References

Bibliography

External links 

 Mémoire et Fortifications: La Place Forte de Lyon
 Les Fortifications: La Métropole et l'héritage de son passé

19th century in Lyon
Fortifications in France
Séré de Rivières system